Endocrine & Metabolism Research Institute (EMRI) is one of Tehran University of Medical Sciences research institute and a pioneering institute with a mission to combine clinical care, research, and education in diabetes, endocrine and metabolic diseases.

History 
The Endocrinology and Metabolism Research Institute was established in 1993 as the Endocrinology and Metabolism Research Centre of Tehran University of Medical Sciences in Dr. Shariati Hospital Campus in Tehran. As a result of its outstanding performance, the Endocrinology and Metabolism Research Centre (EMRC) was promoted to the Endocrinology and Metabolism Research Institute (EMRI) in 2010. In 2012, the institute was officially promoted to the highest possible status of a research organization in Iran.

EMRI has been authorized as the collaborating institute for education, management, and research on osteoporosis and diabetes by the World Health Organization since 2007;.

Research Centers 
The EMRI 's fields of interest include, but are not limited to, diabetes, osteoporosis, endocrinology, biosensors, metabolic disorders, obesity,  noncommunicable diseases, elderly health, chronic diseases, cell therapy and regenerative medicine, metabolomics and genomics, as well as personalized medicine. Each of the abovementioned research fields is covered by a designated research center affiliated with EMRI.

Endocrinology and Metabolism Molecular-Cellular Sciences Institute 

 Biosensor Research Center
 Metabolic Disorders Research Center
 Obesity and Eating Habits Research Center
 Metabolomics and genomics research center
 Cell therapy and regenerative medicine research center

Endocrinology and Metabolism Clinical Sciences Institute 

 Diabetes Research Center
 Diabetes Research Centre was established in 2010 in Endocrinology and Metabolism Research Institute. the main activities of the Diabetes Research Center are focused on the sciences related to diabetes, new treatment methods, including cell therapy and pancreatic transplantation, diabetic foot, and gestational diabetes. the most important achievement of the Diabetes Research Center is producing AngiPars drug for treating diabetic foot ulcers.
 Osteoporosis Research Center
 Osteoporosis Research Center (ORC) is one of the 13 centers affiliated with the Endocrinology and Metabolism Research Institute and was established in 2010 to provide the necessary evidence in the field of osteoporosis at the national and international levels. Currently the ORC collaborate to the World Health Organization since 2010 to 2024 and the International Osteoporosis Foundation.
 Endocrinology and Metabolism Research Center
 Personalized Medicine Research Center
 Evidence-Based Medicine Research Center

Endocrinology and Metabolism Population Sciences Institute 

 Chronic Diseases Research Center
 Elderly Health Research Center
 Non-Communicable Diseases Research Center

International Collaboration

World Health Organization 
Endocrinology and Metabolism Research Institute is WHO Collaborating Center since 2007 in "Research and Education on Management of Osteoporosis and Diabetes".

Collaboration Terms of Reference 

 To support WHO in its work towards reduction and early screening of diabetes, osteoporosis, and their complications, through training and capacity building;
 To support WHO in monitoring and evaluate Sustainable Development Goals (SDGs) through a systematic effort on data collecting, processing and developing analytical models.

International Osteoporosis Organization 

Endocrinology and Metabolism Research Institute has been an active member of IOF, since 2004.EMRI has been involved in raising public awareness and improving professional education by different means such as organizing national and international events, establishment of Osteoporosis Research Center within the institute.

Achievements and Awards

Achievements 

 Partner in Horizon 2020 Framework Programme of the European Union for the Project entitled, "PoC in-office device for identifying individuals at high risk of osteoporosis and osteoporotic fracture"; (Project website)
 The development of a new drug for patients with diabetic foot: Angipars™;
 Collaboration with International Osteoporosis Foundation since 2004;
 Collaborating Center of World Health Organization since 2007;

Awards 

 Razi Medical Research Award, The Best Research center, 2010, 2011, 2012, 2013, 2014, 2016, 2017, 2018, and 2019;
 UN Interagency Task Force on the Prevention and Control of NCDs award, 2018;
 IOF Committee of National Societies Medal, 2018 
 Gold Circle Diabetes Award (IBDO-Italy), 2017;
 Avicenna Medical Research Award, Medical Ethics Awards, Best Research Project Award, 2013;
 World Health Organization, Prize for the Control of Cancer, Cardiovascular Disease and Diabetes in the Eastern Mediterranean 2010.

References

External links 
 Official Website (English Website)
Official Website (Persian Website)

1993 establishments in Iran
Universities in Iran
Research in Iran
Medical research institutes in Iran
University of Tehran
Medical schools in Iran
Universities in Tehran